Bob McLeod (5 May 1913 – 3 July 1958) was a Canadian cyclist. He competed in the 1000m time trial and the team pursuit events at the 1936 Summer Olympics. In 1934, McLeod won a gold medal in the 10 mile cycling event at the 1934 British Empire Games with a silver medal in the time trial event.

In 2015, McLeod was posthumously inducted into the Canada's Sports Hall of Fame.

References

External links
 

1913 births
1958 deaths
Canadian male cyclists
Olympic cyclists of Canada
Cyclists from Ontario
Cyclists at the 1936 Summer Olympics
Sportspeople from Toronto
Commonwealth Games medallists in cycling
Commonwealth Games gold medallists for Canada
Commonwealth Games silver medallists for Canada
Cyclists at the 1934 British Empire Games
Medallists at the 1934 British Empire Games